The 2012–13 synchronized skating season began on July 1, 2012, and ended on June 30, 2013. During this season, which was concurrent with the season for the other four disciplines (men's single, ladies' single, pair skating and ice dancing), elite synchronized skating teams competed on the International Skating Union (ISU) Championship level at the 2013 World and World Junior Championships. They also competed at various other international as well as national competitions.

Competitions
The 2012–13 season included the following major competitions.

Key

International medalists

Season's best scores

Senior teams

Junior teams

References

External links 
 International Skating Union

2012 in figure skating
2013 in figure skating
Seasons in synchronized skating